Steen Lund Hansen (born 6 October 1943) is a Danish sprint canoeist who competed in the late 1960s. He finished ninth in the K-4 1000 m event at the 1968 Summer Olympics in Mexico City.

References

Sports-reference.com profile

1943 births
Canoeists at the 1968 Summer Olympics
Danish male canoeists
Living people
Olympic canoeists of Denmark
Place of birth missing (living people)